Doxercalciferol (or 1-hydroxyergocalciferol,  trade name Hectorol) is drug for secondary hyperparathyroidism and metabolic bone disease.  It is a synthetic analog of ergocalciferol (vitamin D2).  It suppresses parathyroid synthesis and secretion.

Docercalciferol is the vitamin D2 analogue of alfacalcidol. It undergoes 25-hydroxylation in the liver to become the active ercalcitriol, without the involvement of kidneys.

References

Secosteroids
Diols
Vitamin D
Sanofi